Friherre Rutger Maclean I (1688–1748) or Rutger Macklean I was an officer of Charles XII of Sweden who participated in Battle of Holowczyn, Battle of Poltava and Battle of Tobolsk in the Great Northern War.

Biography 
He was the son of David Makeléer, the first governor of Älvsborg County in Sweden. He studied in England.
He married Vilhelmina Eleonora Coyet, who was 30 years younger than him, and they had at least four children:
Baron David Macklean
Rutger Macklean II (1742–1816) who was a central figure in land reform in Sweden in the late 18th and early 19th centuries
Eleonora Charlotta Macklean (1744–1777) born on 12 June 1744 in Svaneholm
Gustaf Macklean, when Gustav III of Sweden was murdered, Gustaf hid one of the murderers at his farm Brodda, nearby Svaneholm.

Ancestors

References 

1688 births
1748 deaths
Clan Maclean
Rutger
Battle of Poltava
Swedish military personnel of the Great Northern War
Swedish people of Scottish descent
17th-century Swedish military personnel
18th-century Swedish military personnel